Visa requirements for Chilean citizens are administrative entry restrictions by the authorities of other states placed on citizens of Chile entering with a Chilean passport.

 Chilean citizens had visa-free or visa on arrival access to 174 countries and territories, ranking the Chilean passport 16th overall in terms of travel freedom, making it the third strongest in the Americas (after the passports of the United States and Canada), and the strongest in all of Latin America, according to the Henley Passport Index.

 the passports of Chile, Brunei and South Korea are the only ones to allow visa-free access to all G8 countries. Chile is also currently the only Latin America country that has visa-waiver access to the United States, as well as  the only Latin America country that has both visa-waiver access to the United States and visa free access to Canada. In addition, citizens of Chile do not need a passport when traveling to Argentina, Bolivia, Brazil, Colombia, Ecuador, Paraguay, Peru, and Uruguay, where they may just use their Cédula de Identidad or identity cards.

Visa requirements map

Visa requirements
Visa requirements for holders of normal passports travelling for tourist purposes:

Chile is an associated member of Mercosur. As such, its citizens enjoy unlimited access to any of the Mercosur full members countries of Argentina, Brazil, Paraguay or Uruguay and the other associated member countries of  Bolivia, Colombia, Ecuador and Peru with the right to residence and work, with no requirement other than nationality. Citizens of these nine countries (including Chile) may apply for a grant of "temporary residence" for up to two years in another country of the bloc.  Then, they may apply for "permanent residence" just before the term of their "temporary residence" expires.

Territories and disputed areas
Visa requirements for Chilean citizens for visits to various territories, disputed areas, partially recognised countries and restricted zones:

APEC Business Travel Card

Holders of an APEC Business Travel Card (ABTC)  travelling on business do not require a visa to the following countries:

1 – up to 90 days
2 – up to 60 days
3 – up to 59 days

The card must be used in conjunction with a passport and has the following advantages:
undertake legitimate business in participating economies
expedited border crossing in all member economies, including transitional members
expedited scheduling of visa interview (United States)

Non-visa restrictions

See also

Visa policy of Chile
Chilean passport

References and Notes
References

Notes

Chile
Foreign relations of Chile